Sheosar Lake is an  alpine lake situated at the western end of Deosai National Park, Gilgit-Baltistan, Pakistan.

Access
The lake is accessible through two routes. One is via Astore and the other via Skardu. From main Astore town, it takes about 4 hours' jeep travel through a semi-metal road to reach Chilum, the last residential area adjacent to the plains. The second route, from Skardu, can be covered by jeep in few hours; however, if trekked, it can take 2 days time.

Climate
Between the months of November to May the area of Deosai is snow bound. During spring, the surrounding area is covered with wide variety of flowers and butterflies. Most visitors come to the lake are in summer between June to early September.

See also
List of lakes in Pakistan
List of national parks in Pakistan

References

External links
HighestLake.com - List of highest lakes
http://pbase.com/waqas Sheosar Lake Photos by Waqas Usman 
Imran Ahmed's Picture Gallery: Sheosar Lake
Ch. Umer's Picture Gallery: Sheosar Lake

Lakes of Gilgit-Baltistan
Tibetan Plateau
Baltistan
Skardu District